Robert Williams (27 January 1848 – 16 October 1918) was a Welsh architect and social campaigner.  Born in South Wales, he studied architecture in London and established a practice there in 1887.  Williams' work showed a Gothic Revival influence and included public and educational buildings in Wales and London including Wheatsheaf Hall and Cowbridge Girls School.  From 1914 he practised in Egypt, constructing Cairo's largest shop for the Davies Bryan Company, as well as a number of other commercial and public buildings.

Williams was a member of the Independent Labour Party and sat on the executive committees of the Land Nationalisation Society and the London Reform Union.  He was elected a London County Council councillor in 1901 and advocated for more stringent housing standards.  Williams wrote several books on housing and advocated for internal toilets at a time when outdoor privies were the norm.  His daughter Margaret Travers Symons was also a social campaigner and suffragette.

Early life 
Williams was born in Ystradowen, Glamorgan, on 27 January 1848.  He was the second son of carpenter Rees Williams and his wife Mary (née Evans).  He was educated at the Eagle Academy, a private school on Eagle Lane, Cowbridge, before being apprenticed to a building contractor.  In 1873 he went to study architecture and building construction at the South Kensington School of Art where he won several school prizes and a national medal.

Williams was married to Margaret Griffiths and the couple had two children, Inigo Rees (born in Llantrisant in 1876) and Margaret Ann (born in Paddington in 1879).  By 1881, when Williams was living in Coggeshall in Essex, his wife had died.  He remarried in 1883 to  Elizabeth Ann Kettle, at Braintree.

Architecture 
Williams took an unusual route to entering the profession.  Rather than being articled to an architect's design office he worked on site as a clerk of works for James Piers St Aubyn and Maurice Bingham Adams.  For Adams Williams supervised improvements to the Marquess of Lothian's Blickling Hall.  Afterwards Williams worked for Waller, Son & Wood of Gloucester.

Williams was admitted to the Royal Institute of British Architects as an associate in 1887, allowing him to set up his own practice in London.  His principal work was in public structures and educational institutions.  He carried out several commissions in his native South Wales, including Pontypool Market Hall (1893–94), Cowbridge Girls School (1895–96) and Pontypool and District Hospital (1903).  Works in London include the Wheatsheaf Hall, Vauxhall (1896) and the People's Hall, West Kensington (1901).  His work shows a Gothic Revival influence, though with an emphasis on amenity.

From 1914 Williams practised in Cairo, Egypt.  He was drawn there by a commission for the Welsh-owned Davies Bryan Company, a retailer.  Williams refurbished one of the company's shops in Alexandria and built a large shop in Cairo.  The Cairo shop, the largest in the city at that time, was a large structure of red Aberdeen granite and Somerset Doulting freestone.  It had a strong Welsh influence, displaying the emblem and motto ("Y Gwir yn Erbyn y Byd" Welsh: "Truth against the world") of the Eisteddfod.

Williams designed several other prominent buildings in Egypt  such as the Bible House in Port Said, the soldiers' home and Marconi Tower in Cairo and banks in Port Said and Tanta.  He wrote Notes on the English Bond, intended as an educational book for local masons and published in English, French and Arabic.

Social campaigning 
Williams was a fervent socialist and counted Keir Hardie and Frank Smith as friends.  Williams' daughter, Margaret Travers Symons, became Hardie's secretary.  A suffragette she became the first woman to speak in the House of Commons after bursting into the chamber during a debate.

Williams stood unsuccessfully for a seat as county councillor for Woolwich in the 1898 London County Council election.  He was successful in winning a seat at Lambeth North in the 1901 London County Council election, representing the Progressive Party.  As a councillor Williams pressed for the LCC to adopt more stringent housing standards.  Williams was a member of the Independent Labour Party and sat on the executive committees of the Land Nationalisation Society and the London Reform Union. 

Williams published a series of booklets on the living conditions of the poor and on building reform. He lamented the poor living conditions of miners, despite the fortunes made by the mine owners. Williams published a book, The Collier's House or Every Collier his own Architect, in 1893 (in English and Welsh) containing drawings showing improved housing for coal miners, particularly in the Welsh Valleys.  He wrote More Light and Air for Londoners - the Effect of the New Streets and Buildings Bill on the Health of the People published in 1894, The Face of the Poor or the Crowding of London's Labourers in 1897 and The Labourer and His Cottage in 1905.  Williams' cottage designs were unusual for the time in showing internal toilets, at a time when outdoor privies were the norm.

Other interests
Williams was also a member of the Cambrian Archaeological Association and drew sketches of their 1897 investigations in Cardiganshire, that were published in Archaeologia Cambrensis and The Builder.  He campaigned for conservation of historic buildings, complaining in the local press about unsympathetic modifications and new-builds.

Williams was widely travelled in Europe, Asia and North Africa.  He maintained a collection of architecture books, that now forms the core of the architecture rare book collection at Cardiff University.

Williams died on 16 October 1918 in Cairo and is buried in the city's Protestant Cemetery.

References 

1848 births
1918 deaths
Welsh architects
Members of London County Council
Progressive Party (London) politicians
Independent Labour Party politicians